Miss República Dominicana 1991 was held on August 21, 1991. There were 24 candidates, representing provinces and municipalities, who entered. The winner would represent the Dominican Republic at Miss Universe 1991 and Miss International 1991. The first runner up would enter Miss World 1991. The second runner up would enter in Miss América Latina 1991. The remaining finalists entered different pageants.

Results

Delegates

External links
search Miss Republica Dominicana 1990

Miss Dominican Republic
1991 beauty pageants
1991 in the Dominican Republic